The Gentlemen of Ireland was an Irish cricket team which played at first-class level in the early part of the 20th century. The team composed of players who were members of the middle and upper classes, usually products of the Irish public school system. A Gentlemen of Ireland team is first recorded in 1846 playing the Royal Artillery at Barrack Field in Woolwich, England. The Gentlemen of Ireland toured North America in 1879, and repeated the tour in 1888, 1892 and 1909. During the 1909 tour, the team played two first-class matches against the Gentlemen of Philadelphia at Haverford and Germantown. The team was captained by Francis Browning for both these matches, which the Gentlemen of Ireland lost by heavy margins. The team did not appear in any recorded cricket after 1909.

First-class matches

References

1846 establishments in Ireland
Cricket teams in Ireland
Former senior cricket clubs
1909 disestablishments in Ireland
Irish cricket tours abroad